The Tsingy wood rail (Mentocrex beankaensis) is a species of bird in the family Sarothruridae that was scientifically described in 2011.

It is endemic to areas with dry deciduous forest and limestone karst in the lowlands of west-central Madagascar. It is larger than the Madagascar wood rail, and also differs in the colour of the throat, moustachial stripe and region near the eyes.

This species was formerly placed in the genus Canirallus together with Madagascar wood rail and the grey-throated rail (Canirallus oculeus). A molecular genetic study published in 2019 found that the grey-throated rail is not closely related to the wood rails. The wood rails were therefore moved to the resurrected genus Mentocrex.

References

Mentocrex
Birds described in 2011